Kopff may refer to:

 1631 Kopff, a main-belt asteroid
 Kopff (crater), a lunar crater

People with the surname 
 August Kopff (1882–1960), German astronomer
 E. Christian Kopff (born 1946), American academic, translator and writer

German-language surnames